The Tennis Tournament at the 2009 Mediterranean Games was held in the Tennis Club Sports Complex
Central in Pescara, Italy.

Medalists

Men's competition

Singles

Women's competition

Singles

References

M
Sports at the 2009 Mediterranean Games
2009